Marcigny is a commune in the Saône-et-Loire department in the region of Bourgogne-Franche-Comté in eastern France.

History
Marcigny was the site of the first Cluniac nunnery, founded in 1056. St Anselm was unsuccessful in attempting to enroll his sister Richeza there after the death of her husband amid the First Crusade. Adela of Normandy, Countess of Blois, mother of King Stephen of England, died in a convent here in 1137.

Economy
The major manufacturer of the city is Emile Henry (ceramic).

See also
Communes of the Saône-et-Loire department

References

Communes of Saône-et-Loire
Burgundy